Ypsolopha contractella is a moth of the family Ypsolophidae. It is known from Japan (the islands of Hokkaido and Honshu), Korea, north-eastern China and the Russian Far East.

The length of the forewings is 7.3-11.2 mm.

References

Ypsolophidae
Moths of Asia
Taxa named by Aristide Caradja